TVN Warner Bros. Discovery (formerly known as TVN Grupa Discovery) is a subsidiary of Warner Bros. Discovery that operates television channels and services in Poland. It operates the TVN Group, a media company acquired by Scripps Networks Interactive, which later got bought by Discovery, Inc.

With the merger of WarnerMedia with Discovery, Inc., and the restructuration of its international business, the company's Polish assets, instead of being under Warner Bros. Discovery EMEA control, were left under its own subsidiary under control of Kasia Kieli, which is also president of TVN Group.

History

Background 
TVN Group, a Polish media company founded on 1995, was acquired by Scripps Networks Interactive in 2015; first a 52.7% majority stake on March, and the remaining stake owned by ITI Group and Canal+ Group on July.

In December 2016, Discovery, Inc. bought a 49% stake on Metro, a recently launched television channel by Agora. In August 2017, Discovery announced that it would buy the remaining 51% stock, gaining complete ownership over the channel.

Establishment 
On March 6, 2018, Scripps was acquired by Discovery, which led to the latter to expand its Polish business. Since then, Discovery merged its localized global networks under TVN Group control.

In 2022, after Discovery completed its merger with WarnerMedia, Kasia Kieli was named president for the group operations in Poland (also being named CEO of TVN Group), noting that Warner Bros. Discovery EMEA had no oversight over operations in the country, making it a separate entity under Warner Bros. Discovery International.

On July 7, 2022, Edward Miszczak, programming director at TVN since its beginnings and member of the board of directors of the company announced its departure, with a transition period in which he will be the director of the newly created programming division at TVN Warner Bros. Discovery.

Local assets 

 TVN Group
 TVN
 TVN 7
 TVN24
 TVN24 BiS
 TVN Fabula
 TVN International
 TVN International Extra
 TVN Style
 TVN Turbo
 TTV
 Canal+ Poland (32%; with Canal+ Group and Liberty Global)
 Discovery Historia
 Metro

Global assets 
 Animal Planet
 Boomerang
 Cartoon Network
 Cinemax 
Cinemax 1
Cinemax 2
 Discovery Channel
 Discovery Life
 Discovery Science 
 DTX
 Eurosport
 Eurosport 1
 Eurosport 2
 Food Network
 HBO 
 HBO 1
 HBO 2 
 HBO 3 
 HGTV
 Investigation Discovery 
 TLC
 Travel Channel
 Warner TV

Leadership 

 Kasia Kieli, President & Managing Director TVN Warner Bros. Discovery and CEO TVN
 Rafał Ogrodnik, Chief Financial Officer, Chief Operating Officer
 Dorota Żurkowska-Bytner, Chief Revenue Officer
 Michał Samul, News Director
 Maciej Gozdowski, Streaming Director
 Bogdan Czaja, Programming & Operations Director
 Jarosław Potasz, Studios & Productions Director

 Dominika Stępińska-Duch, Chief Legal, Privacy and Compliance Officer
 Agnieszka Maciejewska, Chief People and Culture Officer
 Jan Mróz, Chief Communication & PR Officer
 Marcin Bogłowski, Chief Strategy, Insights and Data Officer
 Krzysztof Kozłowski, Chief Technology Officer

References 

2018 establishments in Poland
Mass media companies established in 2018
Warner Bros. Discovery subsidiaries
Companies based in Amsterdam
Mass media in Warsaw
Europe, the Middle East and Africa
TVN (Polish TV channel)